The second season of the television series Xena: Warrior Princess commenced airing in the United States and Canada on September 30, 1996, concluded on  May 12, 1997, and contained 22 episodes.

Xena: Warrior Princess was a syndicated series. Re-runs aired in the United States on the USA Network. The season was released on DVD as a six disc boxed set under the title of Xena: Warrior Princess: Season 2 on September 3, 2003 by Anchor Bay Entertainment.

Production
Crew
Produced by Liz Friedman and Eric Gruendemann, Cinematography was made by Donald Duncan. Editing by Robert Field, Casting directed by Diana Rowan. Production design made by Robert Gillies. Costume Design by Ngila Dickson, Phil Chitty was the construction manager, Kate Lang sculptor (noncredit) and Roger Murray the props designer (noncredit). Special Effects by Brendon Durey, visual Effects by Kevin Blank, Phil Carbonaro and Anna Tkatch. Dennis Thompson was in charge of the Camera and Electrical Department and Simone Knight was in charge of costumes.

Reception

The supervising sound editor, Jason Schmid, won the one-hour series sound editing award at the Motion Picture Sound Editors' Golden Reel Awards for the season's fourth episode, "Girls Just Wanna Have Fun."

Episodes

References

Xena: Warrior Princess seasons
1996 American television seasons
1997 American television seasons